Tolo Harbour, or Tai Po Hoi (historically ) is a sheltered harbour in northeast New Territories of Hong Kong.

Geography
Tide Cove aka. Sha Tin Hoi is to the south of the harbour, and Plover Cove, Three Fathoms Cove and Tolo Channel are to its east.

The Shing Mun River empties first into Tide Cove, then the harbour.

Several islands are located in the harbour, including Ma Shi Chau, Centre Island, Yeung Chau and Yim Tin Tsai. Yuen Chau Tsai is a former island, now connected to the mainland by a causeway.

History
In the past pearls were very abundant here. Pearl hunting had been a major industry in Tai Po from Han Dynasty. In Five Dynasties and Ten Kingdoms period, a king of Southern Han changed the name of Tai Po to Mei Chuen To and ordered an aggressive cultivation effort, which led to many fatalities amongst the pearl hunters. The hunting lasted until the Ming Dynasty, when the pearl oysters were nearly extinct in the area.

Transportation
Kowloon–Canton Railway was built in 1910s and Tolo Highway in 1980s on its western shore.

See also
 Ma Shi Chau Special Area
 List of harbours in Hong Kong

References

External links

 大埔的珠池 (Standard Chinese)
 Satellite view of the harbour and Tide Cove (centre), and Plover Cove, Three Fathoms Cove and the Tolo Channel (right)

Ports and harbours of Hong Kong